The Ministry of Health and Social Protection is a department of the Albanian Government, charged with the responsibility to oversee the running of Albania's healthcare system, including supporting universal and affordable access to medical, pharmaceutical and hospital services, while helping people to stay healthy through health promotion.

History 

In 1914 Prince William of Wied built a new structure, entrusting the then Minister of Health Mihal Turtulli.
In 1920 with the government of the Lushnja Congress, was established the structure of the General Directorate of Health (DPSH), which functioned as such until 1944.

The Ministry of Health was founded in 1944 when DPSH became a Ministry. The Ministry had its structure with 21 employees and 175 Albanian and foreign doctors practicing the activity throughout the country.

Since the establishment of the institution, the Ministry of Health has been reorganized by joining other departments or merging with other ministries, thus resulting in its name changing several times. This list reflects the changes made in years in pluralist history since 1992 as an institution:

 Ministry of Health and Environment from 1992 to 1998
 Ministry of Health from 1998 to 2017
 Ministry of Health and Social Protection from 2017 - current

Subordinate institutions 
The ministry owns and manages all the public hospitals in Albania 
 Albanian Health Insurance Institute 
 Public Health Institute
 National Center for Blood Transfusion
 National Center for the Development and Rehabilitation of Children
 Dental Clinic for Undergraduates
 Medical Helicopter Transportation Unit
 National Center for Medicine and Medical Equipment
 Electro Medical Provider
 National Center for Quality Assurance and Accreditation of Health Institutions
 National Center of Education in Continuity

Officeholders (1944–present)

See also  
Healthcare in Albania
Council of Ministers (Albania)

References

Health
1912 establishments in Albania
Medical and health organizations based in Albania
Albania